This is a list of notable Swiss Turks.

Academia
 
Hatice Altug, Professor of Bioengineering at the École Polytechnique Fédérale de Lausanne
Murat Kunt, scientist 
 , psychiatrist 
Salih Neftçi, Professor of Economics at the New School University (Turkish-Iraqi origin)
, architectural historian

Arts and literature
Jean-Luc Benoziglio, writer and publishing editor (Turkish father)
Ata Bozaci, graphic designer, illustrator and artist
 , journalist and poet
 , writer

Business
Dany Bahar, CEO of Lotus Cars
Elif Sözen-Kohl, banker and daughter-in-law of former German Chancellor Helmut Kohl

Cinema and television
 
Gülsha Adilji, TV presenter (Turkish-Kosovar mother)
 , director, actress and theatre educator
 , film director and screenwriter 
 , film editor
 ,  director and screenwriter
 , film director, screenwriter and columnist
Baran bo Odar, film and television director and screenwriter (Turkish mother)
 , actress (Turkish German origin)
Lale Yavaş, actress
, comedian

Design 
Yves Behar, industrial designer (Turkish father)
 , fashion designer

Music
 
Erkan Aki, singer
Emel Aykanat, singer
Bendeniz, singer
, DJ and house-music producer 
Fernando Corena, opera singer (Turkish father)
Erdal Kızılçay, musician
OZ, record producer 
Atilla Şereftuğ, song writer
Genç Osman Yavaş, singer
 , guitarist
, singer, rapper and producer (Turkish mother and Swiss father)

Politics
 , member of the Greens
 , co-Secretary General of the SP

Religion
, tafsir

Sports
 
 
 
 
 
Endoğan Adili, football player 
Harun Alpsoy, football player
Diren Akdemir, football player
Sinan Akdeniz, football player 
Musa Araz, football player 
Ergün Berisha, football player
Cengiz Biçer, football player 
Önder Çengel, football player
Tunahan Cicek, football player 
Eray Cömert, football player
Ferhat Çökmüş, football player
 , football player 
Fatih Doğan, football player 
Burak Eris, football player 
Kerim Frei, football player 
Levent Gülen, football player
Samet Gunduz, football player
Ali İmren, football player 
Gökhan Inler, football player
Enes Kanter, basketball player
Ertan Irizik, football player 
Serkan Izmirlioglu, football player 
Erhan Kavak, football player
David Deniz Kılınç, football player 
David Kılınç, football player 
Baykal Kulaksızoğlu, football player
Berkan Kutlu, football player 
Deniz Mendi, football player 
Ahmet Özcan, football player 
Attila Sahin, football player 
Ercüment Şahin, football player 
Serkan Şahin, football player
Dilaver Satılmış, football player
Matteus Senkal, football player
Gürkan Sermeter, football player
Berkay Sülüngöz, football player 
Özkan Taştemur, football player
Emir Tombul, football player
İlker Tugal, football player 
Kubilay Türkyilmaz, football players
Necip Ugras, football player 
Murat Ural, football player
Hakan Yakin, football player
Murat Yakin, football player
Ursal Yasar, football player 
Seyhan Yildiz, football player

See also 
Turks in Switzerland
List of Swiss people

References

List
Swiss
Turkish